Cavaglietto is a municipality in the Province of Novara in the Italian region Piedmont, located about  northeast of Turin and about  northwest of Novara.

Cavaglietto borders the following municipalities: Barengo, Cavaglio d'Agogna, Fontaneto d'Agogna, Suno, and Vaprio d'Agogna.

References

Cities and towns in Piedmont